O Globo (The Globe) is a Brazilian newspaper based in Rio de Janeiro. O Globo is the most prominent print publication in the Grupo Globo media conglomerate.

Founded by journalist Irineu Marinho, owner of A Noite, it was originally intended as a morning daily to extend the newspaper interests of the company. In time, it became the flagship paper of the group. When Irineu died weeks after the founding of the newspaper in 1925, it was inherited by his son Roberto. At age 21, he started working as a trainee reporter for the paper and later became managing editor.

Roberto Marinho developed Grupo Globo (the conglomerate of media companies consisting of O Globo, TV Globo, Rádio Globo, Editora Globo and other subsidiaries) as Brazil's largest media group, entering radio in the 1940s and TV in the 1960s, and picking up other interests.

An active supporter of the military dictatorship that lasted from 1964 to 1985 in Brazil, O Globo is still considered a right-wing, conservative newspaper, although it has acknowledged in a 2013 editorial that its "support for the military coup was an error".

Awards
1986, Prince of Asturias Award in Communication.

Political alignment
It has been characterized by supporting the military during the process of political opening in Brazil during the 1980s. It has also been involved in other conflicts for misrepresenting information about popular demonstrations.

An active supporter of the military dictatorship that lasted from 1964 to 1985, O Globo is still considered a right-wing and conservative newspaper.

It follows a strongly liberal line in economic terms, having been a stubborn oppositionist to the progressive governments of Luiz Inacio Lula da Silva and Dilma Rousseff.

Censorship
In 1994, just a day before the premiere in Brazil of the British documentary Beyond Citizen Kane, at the Rio de Janeiro Modern Art Museum, the Military Police confiscated the copy of the film, obeying a court warrant in response to a suit filed by Globo. The film explored the establishment of Rede Globo, the largest television broadcaster in the country, and its ties to the military dictatorship of the period. The director of the museum was threatened with a heavy fine in case of disobedience. Due to the public outcry about the censorship, the Secretary of Culture of Rio de Janeiro was fired three days after the incident.

In 1995, Globo requested in court the confiscation of copies available at the library of the University of São Paulo, but the claim was overruled. The film was restricted to University groups until the 2000s. Globo's attempt to prevent release of the film in Brazil proved to be a failure following the Internet boom in the 2000s. Through the 1990s, the film was illegally screened in universities and political groups without public notice, and later it went "viral" on the Internet.

On 20 August 2009, the newspaper Folha de S. Paulo reported that Rede Record bought the broadcasting rights of the documentary for less than US$20,000. This followed a series of mutual attacks between Globo and Record because of Globo's reporting of a Public Ministry investigation of Edir Macedo and other high-profile members of the Universal Church of the Kingdom of God. Macedo has owned Rede Record since 9 November 1989.

Recent circulation history

References

External links

 
Agência O Globo 
Moglobo – O Globo mobile 

Globo
Globo newspapers
Mass media in Rio de Janeiro (city)
1925 establishments in Brazil
Publications established in 1925